Kichik Kovlyar (also, Kichik Kovlar) is a village in the Sabirabad Rayon of Azerbaijan.

References 

Populated places in Sabirabad District